Horsten is a surname. Notable people with the surname include:

Eelco Horsten (born 1989), Dutch soccer player
Gerrit Horsten (1900–1961), Dutch footballer
Joos Horsten  (1942–2008), Belgian businessman 
Thomas Horsten (born 1994), Dutch soccer player

See also
Hörsten, German municipality